Leuconitocris nigricornis is a species of beetle in the family Cerambycidae. It was described by Olivier in 1795, originally under the genus Necydalis. It is known from Tanzania, South Africa, the Central African Republic, Mozambique, Uganda, Malawi, and Zambia.

Subspecies
 Leuconitocris nigricornis mabokensis Breuning, 1981
 Leuconitocris nigricornis usambica (Kolbe, 1911)
 Leuconitocris nigricornis nigricornis (Olivier, 1795)

References

Leuconitocris
Beetles described in 1795